Judith C.M. Swinkels (born 4 June 1961) is a Dutch politician, she was a member of the House of Representatives of the Netherlands for the Democrats 66 from 3 November 2015 to 23 March 2017. Previously she was a lawyer and judge.

Career
Swinkels was born on 4 June 1961 in Tilburg. She went to the gymnasium in the same city between 1973 and 1979. She subsequently studied civil and European law at Leiden University and graduated in 1984. Swinkels was occupied as a lawyer between 1985 and 1999. Between 1999 and 2002 she worked for the Netherlands Competition Authority. In 2002 Swinkels was appointed as judge in Haarlem. The first five years she was judge for civil and trade law. In 2007 this became civil and family and youth law. In 2011 she switched to civil and criminal law.

In the Parliamentary elections of 2012 Swinkels occupied number 14 on the Democrats 66 party list and was not elected as the party gained 12 seats.

On 3 November 2015 Swinkels joined the House of Representatives of the Netherlands as replacement of Magda Berndsen. She took up the security and justice portfolio which Berndsen previously held. Swinkels had resigned as a judge on 1 November. Her term in the House ended on 23 March 2017.

References

External links
  Parlement.com biography

1961 births
Living people
21st-century Dutch politicians
Democrats 66 politicians
21st-century Dutch judges
20th-century Dutch lawyers
Dutch women lawyers
Leiden University alumni
Members of the House of Representatives (Netherlands)
People from Tilburg